

The Hoxnian Stage was a middle Pleistocene stage (Pleistocene from  million to 11,700 years BP) of the geological history of the British Isles. It was an interglacial which preceded the Wolstonian Stage and followed the Anglian Stage. It is equivalent to Marine Isotope Stage 11 (MIS 11). Marine Isotope Stage 11 started 424,000 years ago and ended 374,000 years ago. The Hoxnian is divided into sub-stages Ho I to Ho IV.

History 
The Hoxnian Stage is named after Hoxne in the English county of Suffolk where some of the deposits created were first found. It was identified and dated with palynology or pollen evidence in the biostratigraphy and later updated with aminostratigraphic techniques. Based on stratigraphic information the Hoxnian happened after the Anglian glacial as Anglian soil is frequently found underneath Hoxnian deposits.

Similarly timed interglacials 
The Hoxnian stage has often been correlated to the Holstein Interglacial of northern Continental Europe and the Mindel-Riss Interglacial of the Alps. However, there is ambiguity regarding the correlation of these two interglacials to either MIS 11 or MIS 9, which is related to the MIS 12 / MIS 10 ambiguity described in more detail in the article 'Elster glaciation'.

The Hoxnian stage has also been equated to the Yarmouthian (Yarmouth) Stage in North America. However, the Yarmouthian Stage, along with the Kansan, Nebraskan, and Aftonian stages, have been abandoned by North American Quaternary geologists and merged into the Pre-Illinoian Stage. At this time, the Hoxnian and Holstein stages are correlated with a brief part of the Pre-Illinoian Stage lying between the Pre-Illinoian A and Pre-Illinoian B glaciations of North America.

Humans 
During the Hoxnian human activity was constrained by the dense forests so humans travelled along rivers and created settlements in valleys. Settlements were selected based on location, resources, and vegetation. The Beeches Pit site revealed humans possibly selected sites rich with flint for toolmaking.

Environment 
The Hoxnian is an interglacial phase meaning the warm periods in between glacial periods. Interglacial phases are heavily vegetated with woodlands interspersed with open areas. Site deposits are often found over Anglian soil which dates to MIS 12. Most sites have been found in valleys with signs of river deposits. During the interglacial the valleys would have been surrounded by dense forests.

Hoxnian sites 
Beeches Pit, West Stow, Suffolk is a site dated to MIS 11 and under 40 km from other sites for the Lower Paleolithic and Middle Paleolithic. Beeches Pit is considered a site of special interest because not only were shells and plant remains found but animal bones that were burnt. The sites around Hitchin, Hertfordshire are associated with lakes caused by the melting of glaciers that settled in holes. When archaeologists dug up the sites they found dense soil full of gravel. The gravel is hypothesized to come from the creation of hand axes. At Marks Tey, Essex the lake soil was rich with pollen spanning all of the Hoxnian and remnants of gravel and artefacts.

See also
Ice age
Glacial period
Last glacial period
Timeline of glaciation

References

Further reading

External links 

Pleistocene
Interglacials